SIAA may refer to:
 Southern Intercollegiate Athletic Association, defunct American college athletic conference
 UDP-N-acetylglucosamine 2-epimerase (hydrolysing), an enzyme